The 7.5 cm Infanteriegeschütz 42 (7.5 cm IG 42) was an infantry support gun, used by Germany, during World War II. The requirement for this weapon came out of combat experience in 1940 when the existing IG 18 was felt to be outdated.

However, by the time Krupp had completed the design a hollow charge shell had been designed for the IG 18 and the gun was not put into production.

In 1944 the requirement was raised again and the barrel from the original design was mated with the carriage from the PAW 600 gun. An order was given for 1,450 guns.

The first IG 42s were delivered in October 1944 equipped with muzzle brakes. It is unclear how many were taken into service until the end of the war.

See also
7.5 cm leichtes Infanteriegeschütz 18
7.5 cm Infanteriegeschütz 37
Artillery
List of artillery

Notes

References 
 http://www.lexikon-der-wehrmacht.de/Waffen/Infanteriegeschutze.htm (in German)
 

World War II artillery of Germany
World War II field artillery
Infantry guns
75 mm artillery
Weapons and ammunition introduced in 1944